Baroness Veronika von Goldschmidt-Rothschild, also known as Bina Rothschild and Veronika Rothschild (née Countess Katharina Eleonore Veronika Irma Luise Henckel von Donnersmarck; 8 February 1902 – 6 October 1965), was a German aristocrat and actress known for playing the Queen of Transylvania in the 1964 musical film My Fair Lady.

Early life and ancestry 
Rothschild was born Countess Katharina Eleonore Veronika Irma Luise Henckel von Donnersmarck on 8 February 1902 in Berlin to Count Lazarus Herbert Patrik Valentin Henckel von Donnersmarck (1869-1940) and Countess Vera Maria Elisabeth Marequita Maximiliane Charlotte Luise von Kanitz (1875-1962). She was a member of the House Henckel of Donnersmarck, a rich Austro-German noble family that originated in modern-day Slovakia. Her maternal grandfather, Count Georg von Kanitz, was a prominent statesman in the German Empire.

Marriage and issue
In 1925, she married Erich Max Benedikt, Baron von Goldschmidt-Rothschild (1899-1987), the son of Baron Maximilian von Goldschmidt-Rothschild and his wife, Baroness Minna Karoline von Rothschild (1857-1903). Her husband was a member of the Goldschmidt and Rothschild banking dynasties. She gave birth to a son:
 Baron Patrick Maximilien von Goldschmidt-Rothschild, (b. 1928); married on 1 July 1967 in Los Angeles to Annika Roman (b. 1928). They have:
 Baron Eric von Goldschmidt-Rothschild (b. 1 Mar 1970)
 Baroness Kristina von Goldschmidt-Rothschild (b.29 Jul 1973)

Biography 
Rothschild played the role of the Queen of Transylvania in the 1964 Lerner and Loewe musical film My Fair Lady, based on George Bernard Shaw's 1913 play Pygmalion. She was not trained as an actress, and was considered by Cecil Beaton, an artistic director for the film, to be the only non-actress suitable to play the role, stating that she had "impeccable deportment and breeding." 

George Cukor, who directed the film, helped her prepare for the role. Beaton had originally wanted Cukor to cast Fritzi Massary for the role, but she demanded too much pay. The part then went to Rothschild, who was costumed with a triple-pronged tiara and three-tiered diamond necklace designed by Beaton.

She died on 6 October 1965, aged 63.

External links 
 Baroness Rothschild IMDB

References 

1902 births
1965 deaths
Actresses from Berlin
Austrian countesses
German film actresses
German countesses
German baronesses
Goldsmith family
Henckel von Donnersmack
Rothschild family